USS Cable (ARS-19) was a  built for the U.S. Navy during World War II. She served in the Pacific Ocean theater of the war. Because of the bravery of her crew in dangerous combat areas, she returned home after the war's end with three battle stars and the Navy Unit Commendation.

Cable was launched 1 April 1943 by Basalt Rock Company in Napa, California; sponsored by Mrs. B. Elliott; and commissioned 6 March 1944.

World War II Pacific Theatre operations 
Cable began her salvage and rescue work while still in shakedown training, when she took in tow for San Diego, California, the water barge AW-86, which had suffered a breakdown off Cape San Lucas, Mexico. Cable cleared San Pedro, California, 30 April 1944, towing small craft to Kwajalein on her way to Milne Bay, New Guinea.

Here she offered salvage and rescue services until sailing 10 August for Manus and Cairns, Australia, where she loaded firefighting and salvage teams. Continuing the lengthy process of invasion preparation, she sailed to Milne Bay to load firefighting equipment, and on 18 October put out from Hollandia, New Guinea, in a convoy of supply ships for the initial landings on Leyte.

Supporting the invasion of the Philippines 
Many ships were damaged in the furious naval and air actions which accompanied the Leyte, and later the Lingayen, operations. Cable's essential services aided many; she made  seaworthy again in only two days after the destroyer had flooded from the 19 shell hits received in the Battle of Surigao Strait. Such duty in San Pedro Bay and Lingayen Gulf was followed by assignment to harbor clearance at Manila through the spring of 1945.

Awarded the Navy Unit Commendation 
Cable's devoted and skillful service in the Philippines was recognized with the award of the Navy Unit Commendation.

Supporting the Borneo invasion 
Cable stood out of Manila Bay on 30 May 1945 where her repair facilities helped ready ships for the Borneo invasion. She steamed to Balikpapan for frontline support in July, and in August returned to the Philippines for continued service through 6 March 1946.

End-of-war activity 
Homeward bound, she towed non-self-propelled Barracks ship APL-18 from Pearl Harbor to San Diego, where she arrived 28 July 1946 for local operations until 28 January 1947. Proceeding to the U.S. East Coast, Cable carried out salvage, rescue, and towing assignments in New England waters until 15 September 1947.

Post-war decommissioning 
In 1947 she was decommissioned at Boston, Massachusetts. She was loaned for commercial service the same day.  She was sunk as a target on 7 August 1978.

Awards 
In addition to the Navy Unit Commendation, Cable received three battle stars for World War II service.

References

External links 
 
 Basalt Rock Company Shipbuilding History

Diver-class rescue and salvage ships
Ships built in Napa, California
World War II auxiliary ships of the United States
1943 ships